The International Formula 3 Korea Super Prix was a Formula Three race held annually on the streets of Changwon, Republic of Korea between 1999 and 2003. The event enjoyed brief success as a sister 'flyaway' event to complement the season-ending Macau Grand Prix, before being replaced in 2004 with an ultimately one-off Bahrain Superprix at the Bahrain International Circuit.

The Korea Super Prix was due to make a return in 2010, at the new Korea International Circuit, but this was cancelled due to "a legal technicality with the circuit" which surfaced just a few weeks before the race was due to run.

Results

Bahrain Superprix

See also
 1999 Korea Super Prix

References

External links
  
 Formula3.info

 
Formula Three races
Defunct motorsport venues
Motorsport in South Korea
Motorsport venues in South Korea
Sport in Changwon